Ryongjiwŏn station is a railway station in Ryongjiwŏl-li, Kosan county, Kangwŏn province, North Korea, on the Kangwŏn Line of the Korean State Railway.

The station, along with the rest of the former Kyŏngwŏn Line, was opened by the Japanese on 16 August 1914. A new station building was opened in 2017 to replace the one built in the 1950s.

References

Railway stations in North Korea